Ida Golin (born 16 December 1959) is an Italian former international football striker for Lazio.

International career

Golin had 41 caps for the Italy women's national football team and scored 27 goals.

Honours

Club 
Lazio
 Serie A (2): 1980, 1987–88

International 
Italy
 UEFA Women's Championship Third place: 1987

References

1959 births
Living people
Women's association football defenders
Italian women's footballers
Italy women's international footballers
Serie A (women's football) players
S.S. Lazio Women 2015 players